A United States Under Secretary of Commerce is one of several positions in the United States Department of Commerce, serving under the United States Secretary of Commerce.

History
In June 1939, Edward J. Noble was appointed the first Under Secretary of Commerce a role created especially for him by President Franklin D. Roosevelt that had a salary of $10,000 per year. He was succeeded by Wayne Chatfield-Taylor, the former Assistant Secretary of the Treasury who later served as president of the Export-Import Bank. The role was later held by various prominent people, including Cornelius Vanderbilt Whitney (under President Truman), and Franklin D. Roosevelt Jr. (under Presidents Kennedy and Johnson), when the job had a salary of $21,000 per year. On December 13, 1979, President Jimmy Carter replaced the role of Under Secretary, which was then held by Luther H. Hodges Jr., with United States Deputy Secretary of Commerce, and Hodges became the first holder.

Transportation
In 1950, President Truman proposed transferring the functions of the Maritime Commission to the Department of Commerce to be led by the newly created Under Secretary of Commerce for Transportation. Truman had created Civil Aeronautics Administration and transferred the Bureau of Public Roads within the department the previous year. In 1966, all transportation activities of Commerce were moved to the newly established United States Department of Transportation, which was led by former Under Secretary Alan Stephenson Boyd.

Current positions
The Under Secretary positions are:

 Under Secretary of Commerce for Economic Affairs (created June 16, 1982)
 Under Secretary of Commerce for Industry and Security (created 2001)
 Under Secretary of Commerce for Intellectual Property (created January 17, 2001)
 Under Secretary of Commerce for International Trade (created January 1, 1989)
 Under Secretary of Commerce for Oceans and Atmosphere (created December 1971)
 Under Secretary of Commerce for Standards and Technology (created 2010)
 Under Secretary of Commerce for Minority Business Development (created 2022)

Former Under Secretaries

List of former Under Secretaries of Commerce

List of former Under Secretaries of Commerce for Transportation

References

External links
 General Records of the Department of Commerce at the National Archives

Under Secretary